The Hartford Knights were a professional American football team based in Hartford, Connecticut. They began play in 1968 as a member of the Atlantic Coast Football League, replacing the Hartford Charter Oaks. For the 1969 season, they became the affiliate for the Buffalo Bills of the American Football League. One of the best minor-league football teams of its era, the Knights never finished below second place in their league, won every division title they contested, and had a winning record every season they played (including a 17-win perfect season in 1972). 

The Knights' most prominent alumnus was fullback Marv Hubbard, who played his first professional season with the team in 1968 before appearing in multiple Pro Bowls as a member of the Oakland Raiders. Other notable players included Manch Wheeler, the team's first starting quarterback who had previously played for the Bills; and Mel Meeks, a power-runner who was one of the league's best running backs.

Season-by-season results

References

Atlantic Coast Football League teams
American football teams in Connecticut
Defunct sports teams in Connecticut
Sports in Hartford, Connecticut
1968 establishments in Connecticut
1973 disestablishments in Connecticut
American football teams established in 1968
American football teams disestablished in 1973